Omaha is the largest city in Nebraska, United States.

Omaha may also refer to:

Places
 Omaha Beach, the Allied code name for one of the June 6, 1944, Battle of Normandy landing sites
 Omaha, New Zealand, north of Auckland

United States
 Omaha, Alabama
 Omaha, Arkansas
 Omaha, Georgia
 Omaha, Illinois
 Omaha, Missouri
 Omaha, Texas
 Omaha, Virginia

Games and sports
 Omaha (horse), winner of the US Triple Crown of Thoroughbred Racing in 1935
 College World Series, the tournament that ends the NCAA Division I baseball season, held in Omaha and thus sometimes called "Omaha"
 Omaha hold 'em, a poker variant
 Omaha Mavericks, the athletic program of the University of Nebraska Omaha

Music
 Omaha (album), 2008 album by Ulf Lundell
 "Omaha", a 1973 song by Waylon Jennings from Honky Tonk Heroes
 "Omaha", a 1994 song by Counting Crows from August and Everything After
 "Omaha", a 1967 song by Moby Grape from Moby Grape
 "Omaha", a song by Tapes 'n Tapes

Ships
 USS Omaha (1869), a sloop which served in the last decades of the 19th century
 USS Omaha (CL-4), the lead ship of the Omaha-class of light cruiser, served during World War II
 USS Omaha (SSN-692), a Los Angeles-class submarine, served during the last years of the Cold War
 USS Omaha (LCS-12), a Independence-class littoral combat ship, serving since 2018

Other uses
 Omaha people, a Native American tribe that currently resides in the northeastern part of the US state of Nebraska
 Omaha (software), Google's open-source project providing automated deployment of software updates

See also
 Omaha Township (disambiguation)
 Omaha the Cat Dancer, a graphic novel
 Omaha Steaks, a US meat retailer
 Omaha kinship, a patrilineal kinship system
 University of Nebraska Omaha, often referred to as Omaha